Forest Knolls is a neighborhood of San Francisco, located within the Inner Sunset built on the southwestern side of Mount Sutro, near the main UCSF campus. Warren Drive is the southern and western border, Mount Sutro is the northern border and the Midtown Terrace neighborhood is to the east. Homes are mostly fully detached and many have views of the San Francisco Bay or Pacific Ocean.

References

Neighborhoods in San Francisco